There have been two baronetcies created for persons with the surname Porter, both in the Baronetage of the United Kingdom.

The Porter Baronetcy, of Frimley in the County of Surrey, was created in the Baronetage of the United Kingdom on 27 June 1889 for the surgeon George Porter. The title became extinct on the death of the third Baronet in 1974.

The Porter Baronetcy, of Merrion Square in the City and County of Dublin, was created in the Baronetage of the United Kingdom on 22 July 1902. For more information on this creation, see Horsbrugh-Porter baronets.

Porter baronets, of Frimley (1889)
Sir George Hornidge Porter, 1st Baronet (1822–1895)
Sir William Henry Porter, 2nd Baronet (1862–1935)
Sir George Swinburne Porter, 3rd Baronet (1908–1974)

Porter, later Horsbrugh-Porter baronets, of Merrion Square (1902)
see Horsbrugh-Porter baronets

Notes

References
Kidd, Charles, Williamson, David (editors). Debrett's Peerage and Baronetage (1990 edition). New York: St Martin's Press, 1990, 

Extinct baronetcies in the Baronetage of the United Kingdom